Jack Leconte (born 19 November 1959) is a retired French racing driver.

References

1959 births
Living people
French racing drivers
24 Hours of Le Mans drivers

Larbre Compétition drivers
Sports car racing team owners